Honey walnut shrimp is a Western-inspired Cantonese dish of lightly battered prawns in a mayonnaise-based sauce, served with candied walnuts, and is commonly served in Chinese banquet meals. The dish may have originated in Hong Kong, before being introduced to the United States in the 1980s and 1990s.

References 

American Chinese cuisine
Hong Kong cuisine
Shrimp dishes
Walnut dishes